The Halton Baronetcy, of Samford Parva in the County of Essex, was a title in the Baronetage of England.  It was created on 10 September 1642 for William Halton.  The title became extinct on the death of the sixth Baronet on 9 February 1823 aged 77.

Halton baronets, of Samford (1642)

Sir William Halton, 1st Baronet ( – 1662)
Sir William Halton, 2nd Baronet (died 1675)
Sir Thomas Halton, 3rd Baronet (died 1726)
Sir William Halton, 4th Baronet (died 1754)
Sir Thomas Halton, 5th Baronet (died 1766)
Sir William Halton, 6th Baronet (c. 1746 – 1823)

References

 

Extinct baronetcies in the Baronetage of England